Cherokee Township may refer to:

 Cherokee Township, in Sharp County, Arkansas
 Cherokee Township, Cherokee County, Iowa
 Cherokee Township, Cherokee County, Kansas
 Cherokee Township, Montgomery County, Kansas, in Montgomery County, Kansas
 Cherokee Township, Payne County, Oklahoma, defunct; see List of Oklahoma townships
 Cherokee Township, Wagoner County, Oklahoma, defunct; see List of Oklahoma townships

Township name disambiguation pages